Sontheim (full name: Sontheim an der Brenz) is a municipality in the district of Heidenheim in Baden-Württemberg in southern Germany. It is located northeast of Ulm, at the southern end of the Swabian Jura.

Neighboring municipalities
Sontheim shares borders with the following towns and villages: Hermaringen (Heidenheim District) in the north, Bächingen an der Brenz (Dillingen District, Bavaria) in the east and the south, as well as Niederstotzingen (Heidenheim District) in the west.

Villages
Sontheim an der Brenz consists of the main community Sontheim and the villages of Brenz and Bergenweiler. Brenz and Bergenweiler became part of Sontheim during Baden-Württemberg's last district reform in the 1970s.

Twin towns
The town is twinned with:
  Saint-Valery-en-Caux, France

References

Heidenheim (district)